Crosley Tower is a 16-story campus building of the University of Cincinnati in Cincinnati, Ohio. It was designed in the Brutalist style by A.M. Kinney Associates, a Cincinnati architecture firm.

Attributes
Crosley Tower has  between 16 stories. The tower, along with its counterpart Rieveschl Hall, has massive concrete columns that flare at the top. It is roughly square, and resembles an abstract fluted Corinthian column. The tower is a symbol of the university, and a visual landmark, visible from most areas on the campus and beyond.

History
The tower was completed in 1969 for $5 million. It was named after University of Cincinnati alumnus Powel Crosley Jr. 

In 2017, the building was featured at the top of a list of America's ugliest university buildings, as compiled by Architectural Digest. In 2020, Cincinnati Magazine included it in a list of iconic Cincinnati architecture that defines the city.

In 2018, university officials announced the building's planned demolition. The structure has not been well maintained, with problems including crumbling exterior concrete, a sinking foundation, and leaking ceilings. The officials also described that the building does not function well for the university, and that renovations would be difficult due to its thick, seamless concrete walls. Its chemistry and biology labs must be relocated off-site before the demolition can take place. In 2020, the college set 2025 as the soonest date for demolition, pending construction of Clifton Court Hall and renovation of the Old Chemistry Building.

In 2021, the student organization "Crosley Tower Appreciation Club" was started at the University of Cincinnati. Some society activities include photography competitions and watching movies projected against the building's side.

References

External links

 
 
 Crosley Tower photos

University of Cincinnati
Brutalist architecture in Ohio
1969 establishments in Ohio
Buildings and structures completed in 1969